The 1997–98 season was Burnley's 3rd successive season in the third tier of English football. They were managed by Chris Waddle in his only full season since he replaced Adrian Heath at the beginning of the campaign.

Appearances and goals

|}

Transfers

In

Out

Matches

Second Division

Final league position

League Cup

1st Round First Leg

1st Round Second Leg

2nd Round First Leg

2nd Round Second Leg

FA Cup

1st Round

1st Round Replay

Football League Trophy

Northern Section 2nd Round

Northern Section Quarter Final

Northern Section Semi Final

Northern Section Final First Leg

Northern Section Final Second Leg

References

Burnley F.C. seasons
Burnley